The Iupshara is a river in northern Abkhazia. The river flows from Lake Ritsa to the Gega River, a tributary of the Bzyb River.

The highest discharge of the Iupshara is in May, and the lowest in February, .

References

Rivers of Abkhazia